"Marry Me" is a song written by Pat Monahan and recorded by the group Train, for their fifth studio album Save Me, San Francisco. The song was released on October 25, 2010 as the album's third single. The single peaked in the top 40 on the Billboard Hot 100, marking the first time the band has had three consecutive top 40 hits and also had three songs from one album chart on the Hot 100.

It performed well on Adult Contemporary radio, where it has peaked within the Top 5 of the Billboard Adult Contemporary chart and the Adult Pop Songs chart.

Background
Lead singer and songwriter of Train, Pat Monahan stated in several interviews that the song was initially a very short tune, consisting only of a verse and a chorus, but he was later influenced to continue on with the song to capitalize on the initial simple beauty of the song.

Music video
The music video for the song was directed by Lex Halaby. It was posted to YouTube on December 12, 2010, and released to the public by early January 2011. 

The concept of the video consists of three main outlets - it starts off with separate shots of different couples sitting on a couch and reminiscing about the start of their relationships and the details of how they met.
The rest of the video alternates between two different environments, starting with a diner in which a love at first sight moment occurs between Pat Monahan and the waitress of the diner, played by Anna Camp, when their eyes meet.

The second alternate environment is the band performing the song, with drummer Scott Underwood on piano and Jimmy Stafford on guitar, with a gray background.

The story of the video progresses with the waitress looking at the table where Pat was sitting only to find that he has left, causing her to become regretful of not taking a chance to talk to Pat. The waitress eventually runs out of the diner, hoping that her true love has not gone far, but is disappointed to realize that that's not the case. She then returns to the table where Pat was sitting and finds that he's left his hat.  She looks up to see Pat return to the diner, their eyes meet, and he smiles.  The final shot of the video depicts two steaming cups of coffee on either side of a table in the diner.

Charts
"Marry Me" debuted at number 95 on the Billboard Hot 100 and reached number 34.
In April 2011, the single topped 1,000,000 in digital downloads.

Weekly charts

Year-end charts

Certifications

Martina McBride version

Country music artist Martina McBride recorded a duet version with Pat Monahan for her eleventh studio album, Eleven. It was released as the third single from the album on March 26, 2012.

Chart performance

References

2010 singles
2012 singles
Train (band) songs
Columbia Records singles
Pop ballads
Rock ballads
Folk ballads
Soul ballads
Songs about marriage
Songs written by Pat Monahan
Martina McBride songs
Republic Records singles
Song recordings produced by Byron Gallimore
Republic Nashville singles
2010 songs